The Second United Front was the alliance between the ruling Kuomintang (KMT) and the Chinese Communist Party (CCP) to resist the Japanese invasion of  China during the Second Sino-Japanese War, which suspended the Chinese Civil War from 1937 to 1945.

Background
In 1927 the Chinese Communists retaliated against Kuomintang following a betrayal of its members in Shanghai by National Revolutionary Army commander Chiang Kai-shek, which marked the end of the KMT's four-year alliance with the Soviet Union and its cooperation with the CCP during the Northern Expedition (aka First United Front) to defeat warlords and unify China.

In 1931 the Japanese launched its invasion and subsequent occupation of Manchuria.  Chiang Kai-shek, who de facto led the central government of China, decided that China must avoid all-out war with Japan due to domestic turmoil and inadequate preparation.  Therefore, he "pursued a strategy of appeasing Japan while struggling for real national unity and over time sufficient strength to confront the Imperial army. This appeasement policy lasted for another six years". Even though his campaigns against the Communists resulted in their retreat and a 90% reduction in their fighting strength, he was unable to eliminate their forces entirely, and his policy of "internal pacification before external resistance" was very unpopular with the Chinese populace, which caused widespread resentment and demonstration against the ruling KMT leadership and its regional warlord allies.

Xi'an Incident

In 1936, Chiang Kai-shek assigned "The Young Marshal" Zhang Xueliang, leader of Northeastern Army, the duty of suppressing the Red Army of the CCP. Battles with the Red Army resulted in great casualties for Zhang's forces, but Chiang Kai-shek did not provide any support to his troops.

On 12 December 1936, a deeply disgruntled Zhang Xueliang kidnapped Chiang Kai-shek in Xi'an to force an end to the conflict between KMT and CCP. To secure the release of Chiang, the KMT was forced to agree to a temporary end to the Chinese Civil War and the forming of a united front between the CCP and KMT against Japan on 24 December 1936. However, by the time Chiang arrived in Xi'an on 4 December 1936, negotiations for a united front had been in the works for two years.

The China Democratic League, an umbrella organization for three political parties and three political pressure groups, also agreed to take part in the united front formed by KMT and the CCP.

Cooperation during the War of Resistance

As a result of the truce between KMT and CCP, the Red Army was reorganized into the New Fourth Army and the 8th Route Army, which were placed under the command of the National Revolutionary Army. The CCP agreed to accept the leadership of Chiang Kai-shek, and began to receive some financial support from the central government run by KMT. In agreement with KMT Shaan-Gan-Ning Border Region and Jin-Cha-Ji Border Region were created. They were controlled by the CCP.

After the commencement of full-scale war between China and Japan, the Communists forces fought in alliance with the KMT forces during the Battle of Taiyuan, and the high point of their cooperation came in 1938 during the Battle of Wuhan.

However, the Communists submission to the chain of command of the National Revolutionary Army was in name only. The Communists acted independently and hardly ever engaged the Japanese in conventional battles. The level of actual coordination between the CCP and KMT during the Second Sino-Japanese War was minimal.

Breakdown and aftermath

In the midst of the Second United Front, the Communists and the Kuomintang were still vying for territorial advantage in "Free China" (i.e. those areas not occupied by the Japanese or ruled by puppet governments).  The uneasy alliance began to break down by late 1938 as a result of the Communists' efforts to aggressively expand their military strength through absorbing Chinese guerrilla forces behind enemy lines. For Chinese militia who refused to switch their allegiance, the CCP would call them "collaborators" and then attack to eliminate their forces. For example, the Red Army led by He Long attacked and wiped out a brigade of Chinese militia led by Zhang Yin-wu in Hebei in June, 1939.

In December 1940, Chiang Kai-shek demanded that the CCP's New Fourth Army evacuate Anhui and Jiangsu Provinces.  Despite the intense pressure, the New Fourth Army commanders committed insubordination by marching in an unauthorized direction and also missed the deadline to evacuate. Added to this were the attacks by the Communist Party on the Kuomintang Forces in Hebei in August 1939 and in Jiangsu in October 1940, so they were ambushed and defeated by Nationalist troops in January 1941. This clash, which would be known as the New Fourth Army Incident, weakened but didn't end the CCP position in Central China and effectively ended any substantive co-operation between the Nationalists and the Communists and both sides concentrated on jockeying for position in the inevitable Civil War. It also ended the Second United Front formed earlier to fight the Japanese.

Afterwards, within the Japanese occupied provinces and behind enemy lines the KMT and CCP forces carried on warfare with each other, with the Communists eventually destroying or absorbing the KMT partisan forces or driving them into the puppet forces of the Japanese.  The communists under the leadership of Mao Zedong also began to focus most of their energy on building up their sphere of influence wherever opportunities were presented, mainly through rural mass organizations, administrative, land and tax reform measures favoring poor peasants; while the KMT allocated many divisions of its regular army to carry out military blockade of the CCP areas in an attempt to neutralize the spread of Communist influence until the end of the Second Sino-Japanese War.

After 1945 

After the Second Sino-Japanese War, Chiang Kai-shek and Mao Zedong attempted to engage in peace talks. This effort failed and by 1946 the KMT and the Chinese Communist Party were engaged in all-out civil war. The Communists were able to obtain seized Japanese Army weapons in the Northeast – with Soviet acquiesce – and took the opportunity to engage the already weakened KMT. In October 1949, Mao established the People's Republic of China, while Chiang retreated to the island of Taiwan.

See also
 First United Front
 United front (People's Republic of China)
 United front in Taiwan
 United front in Hong Kong

References

Citations

Sources 

 Resistance and Revolution in China

 

1930s in China
1940s in China
China in World War II
Chinese Civil War
Defunct left-wing political party alliances
National Revolutionary Army
Political party alliances in China
Second Sino-Japanese War
History of the Chinese Communist Party
United front (China)